The Soviet designation Project 1171 (Tapir-class) landing ship (NATO reporting name: Alligator) is a class of Soviet / Russian general purpose, beachable amphibious warfare ships (Soviet classification: large landing ship).

History

In Soviet post-World War II analysis of amphibious operations, the recommendation was made that the Soviet Navy should start building dedicated amphibious ships.

A newer type of amphibious warship followed in the late 1950s, a true landing ship tank (LST) that was named Project 1171 and also called Tapir. Labelled "Large Landing Ship", its displacement was 4,360 tons full load and could transport up to 313 troops and 20 tanks. Additional vehicles could be stored on the upper deck. NATO gave these ships the code name "Alligator", and several subtypes were created.

The design of Project 1171 was initiated in 1959 by the Navy, while a similar dual-purpose Project 1173 was ordered by the civilian Ministry of Shipping. Eventually both designs were merged under the Project 1171 umbrella, and the resulting vessel was a compromise between military (speed, survivability) and civil (fuel economy) objectives. The design team produced four different configurations; the Navy selected the most powerful and fastest option, which was also the least fuel-efficient, while the civil Ministry of Shipping withdrew from the project completely. All production ships were made for the Navy and never operated on shipping lines.

A total of 14 vessels were completed between 1964 and 1975; all were retired between 1992 and 1995. As of September 2008, two vessels, currently named Orsk and Saratov, were in active service with the 197th Brigade of Landing Ships in the Russian Black Sea Fleet. As of March 2014, Saratov and Nikolay Filchenkov were in service with the 197th Brigade of Landing Ships in the Black Sea Fleet, Nikolay Vilkov was in service with the 100th Brigade of Landing Ships in the Russian Pacific Fleet, and Orsk was inactive and undergoing refits.

Saratov (BDK-65) was launched in July 1964, commissioned in 1966 as Voronezhsky Komsomolets. As a lead ship of a formation, it lacked the habitable troop compartments installed on other ships of the class. Saratov was stationed in Donuzlav (Black Sea Fleet) until the Union collapsed and then remained mothballed in Odessa until 1994. The ship was reported in active operations in 2000 and later.

From 2013 on, Nikolai Fil'chenkov and Saratov were used to transport military equipment from Novorossiysk to Tartus in Syria, during an intervention in the Syrian civil war, along with  ships.

Orsk (BDK-69) was launched and commissioned in 1968 as Nikolay Obekov. It served a total of 11 campaigns in the Indian and Atlantic oceans and the Mediterranean. Later, under the Russian flag, it carried troops and materials to Yugoslavia, Adjaria, and Abkhazia. In 2018 the vessel was seen transporting Russian equipment to Syria. In 2022 it appeared on 21 March in Russian TV reports unloading military equipment in the Russian-occupied Ukrainian port Berdiansk, which led to initial confusion when its sister ship Saratov was destroyed three days later at the same place.

During the 2022 Russian invasion of Ukraine, in the aftermath of the Battle of Berdiansk, Saratov was reported as destroyed by a Ukrainian attack on 24 March 2022 while in the harbour of Russian-occupied Ukrainian Port of Berdiansk. Video showed a large fire, smoke, and explosions, with one explosion engulfing the bow of the ship. The ship was originally reported as having been Orsk, but the General Staff of the Ukrainian Armed Forces later reported that Saratov had been destroyed, and two  ships,  and  damaged. Russian sources confirmed a missile attack on Berdiansk harbour (without clarification of missile type), which damaged two landing ships - Saratov and unnamed one, as well as sinking Saratov. On 2 July 2022, Russian official in southern Ukraine confirmed a Tochka-U ballistic missile was used back on 24 March to target the Port of Berdiansk and that Saratov was scuttled by its crew in order "to prevent detonation of the on-board munitions by the fire that had started". There are no reports about the damage on the ship but it has been salvaged and it is planned to be towed to Kerch, Crimea.

Ships of class

See also
List of active Russian Navy ships
List of ships of the Soviet Navy
List of ships of Russia by project number

References

External links

 All Alligator Class Landing Ships – Complete Ship List

Amphibious warfare vessel classes
Cold War amphibious warfare vessels of the Soviet Union
Amphibious warfare vessels of the Soviet Navy
Amphibious warfare vessels of the Russian Navy